Mikhail Alekseyevich Kizeyev (born 17 March 1997) is a Russian football player who plays for Sever Murmansk.

Club career
He made his debut in the Russian Football National League for FC Zenit-2 Saint Petersburg on 24 September 2017 in a game against FC Olimpiyets Nizhny Novgorod.

References

External links
 Profile by Russian Football National League
 
 Mikhail Kizeyev stats for Akritas Chlorakas 2019-20

1997 births
Sportspeople from Vladivostok
Living people
Russian footballers
Association football goalkeepers
FC Zenit Saint Petersburg players
FC Zenit-2 Saint Petersburg players
Akritas Chlorakas players
FC Codru Lozova players
FC Sever Murmansk players
Russian First League players
Cypriot Second Division players
Moldovan Super Liga players
Russian expatriate footballers
Russian expatriate sportspeople in Cyprus
Expatriate footballers in Cyprus
Russian expatriate sportspeople in Moldova
Expatriate footballers in Moldova